Wellman is a city in Terry County, Texas, United States. The city was formed in 1918 as a shipping point on the Santa Fe Railroad and named after Augustus Ogden Wellman, who had been an assistant to the railroad's secretary and treasurer. Its population was 203 at the 2010 census.

Geography

Wellman is located at  (33.047108, –102.428023).

According to the United States Census Bureau, the city has a total area of 0.3 square miles (0.9 km), all of it land.

Demographics

As of the census of 2000,  203 people, 74 households, and 56 families were residing in the city. The population density was 589.3 people per square mile (230.5/km). The 94 housing units had an average density of 272.9/sq mi (106.7/km). The racial makeup of the city was 83.74% White, 2.46% Native American, 11.82% from other races, and 1.97% from two or more races. Hispanics or Latinos of any race were 29.06% of the population.

Of the 74 households, 40.5% had children under the age of 18 living with them, 67.6% were married couples living together, 6.8% had a female householder with no husband present, and 24.3% were not families. About 24.3% of all households were made up of individuals, and 10.8% had someone living alone who was 65 years of age or older. The average household size was 2.74, and the average family size was 3.30.

In the city, the age distribution was 31.5% under 18, 6.4% from 18 to 24, 19.7% from 25 to 44, 28.1% from 45 to 64, and 14.3% who were 65 or older. The median age was 38 years. For every 100 females, there were 88.0 males. For every 100 females age 18 and over, there were 98.6 males.

The median income for a household in the city was $50,833, and for a family was $55,357. Males had a median income of $28,750 versus $32,188 for females. The per capita income for the city was $15,757. About 18.8% of families and 22.0% of the population were below the poverty line, including 34.9% of those under the age of 18 and 13.3% of those 65 or over.

Education
Wellman is served by the Wellman-Union Consolidated Independent School District. The former Wellman Independent School District merged into Wellman-Union CISD on July 1, 1997.

References

Cities in Terry County, Texas
Cities in Texas